The War College (Czech: Vysoká škola válečná) was a military staff college in Prague established by the government of Czechoslovakia in 1921 with the assistance of France. Originally called the War School, it was renamed the War College in 1934. It occupied the third floor of Tychonova 1 in Prague - as of 2017 the headquarters of the Czech Ministry of Defense.

Notable alumni of the War College included Emanuel Moravec. The War College ceased operations in 1938.

References

1921 establishments in Czechoslovakia
Military history of Czechoslovakia
1938 disestablishments in Czechoslovakia
Czechoslovakia–France relations
Staff colleges